Frangiskos Papamanolis (born on December 5, 1936 in Ano Syros, Greece) is the Roman Catholic bishop emeritus of Syros and Milos, bishop emeritus of Santorini and Apostolic Administrator emeritus of Crete. In 1962 Papamanolis was ordained priest of the Order of Friars Minor Capuchin and on July 27, 1974 was appointed bishop, being ordained on October 20, 1974.

External links
 http://www.catholic-hierarchy.org/bishop/bpapa.html
 https://web.archive.org/web/20141218000019/http://www.cathecclesia.gr/hellas/index.php/2008-03-19-22-02-01/-a-/2008-03-19-22-20-37.html

1936 births
20th-century Roman Catholic bishops in Greece
Capuchin bishops
People from Ano Syros
Living people
21st-century Roman Catholic bishops in Greece